Madison Township is one of fifteen townships in Fillmore County, Nebraska, United States. The population was 649 at the 2020 census.

A portion of the city of Geneva lies within the township.

See also
County government in Nebraska

References

External links
City-Data.com

Townships in Fillmore County, Nebraska
Townships in Nebraska